Jakdan Rural District is a rural district (dehestan) in the Central District of Bashagard County, Hormozgan Province, Iran. At the 2006 census, its population was 8,078, in 1,861 families. The rural district has 38 villages.

References 

Rural Districts of Hormozgan Province
Bashagard County